Housetop Mountain ( is located in the Teton Range, Caribou-Targhee National Forest in the U.S. state of Wyoming.

References

Mountains of Wyoming
Mountains of Teton County, Wyoming